Son of the Dragon is the first Hallmark Movie Channel original television film. It premiered on Hallmark Movie Channel on Wednesday, April 2, 2008, and helped launch the new channel.  It was also the first movie for either of the two American cable networks to be shot and shown in HDTV.

Plot summary
The classic Arabian Nights tale "The Thief of Bagdad" is retold and relocated to ancient China.

D.B. (or "Devil Boy") (John Reardon) was abandoned at birth and rescued from the docks of Shanghai to grow into an impetuous thief who steals to provide food for the street children he considers his family. Now the young man and his wise partner Bird (David Carradine), have their eyes on stealing the royal court's jewels.  They devise a plan to get into the court by wooing the Governor's daughter, Princess Li Wei (Desiree Siahaan) with whom he is immediately attracted to. However, they are met with strong competition from other potential suitors, especially the Prince of the North (Rupert Graves) who is the Governor's personal choice.  The Princess, however, finds D.B. most intriguing and manages to convince her father to challenge all her suitors with rigorous trials to prove their worth.

As various suitors proceed with the tests put before them, the Princess sends along her lady-in-waiting, Ting Ting (Theresa Lee), disguised as a man to keep D.B. safe.  However, the Princess doesn't know that Ting Ting already knows D.B. and has her own secret feelings for him.

Cast
 John Reardon as D.B. (or "Devil Boy")
 David Carradine as Bird
 Desiree Ann Siahaan as Princess Li Wei
 Rupert Graves as The Prince of the North
 Theresa Lee as Ting Ting
 Kay Tong Lim as Governor
 Eddy Ko as Lord Shing
 Michael Chow as Bo

Filming locations
Filming took place in Hengdian TV City, China, and Yong Kang Shiguliao Film and Television Studio in Zhejiang Province, China.  The location houses an exact replica of the Forbidden City.

Home Media
This film was released in DVD format in October 2007, with English audio, no subtitles, and a running time of 174 min., by RHI Entertainment. In July 2015 it was released in DVD format by Mill Creek Entertainment, with English audio, no subtitles, and a running time of 178 min.

See also
 Hallmark Movie Channel

References

External links
 
 
 Son of the Dragon at RHI Entertainment
 Son of the Dragon at Hallmark Channel's Press Site

2008 television films
2008 films
Hallmark Channel original films
English-language Canadian films
Sonar Entertainment miniseries
2008 drama films
Canadian drama television films
American drama television films
2000s American films
2000s Canadian films